Michael Rapino is a Canadian-American business executive and the Chief Executive Officer and President of Live Nation Entertainment, Inc, which was formed in 2010 following the merger of Live Nation and Ticketmaster.

In the late 1990s, Rapino co-founded Core Audience Entertainment, a concert promoting company, and later held several roles at Clear Channel Entertainment. He was named CEO of Live Nation in 2005.

Early life and education 
Michael Rapino was born in Thunder Bay, Ontario, Canada, and earned a bachelor of administration degree from Lakehead University in 1989. While attending Lakehead, Rapino promoted bands at local bars and signed his first artist, Jeff Healey.

Career 
While at Lakehead, Rapino landed a job as a beer rep for Labatt Breweries and started promoting bands at local bars, arranging a weekly ad in The Argus (Thunder Bay) called "The Blue Zone" that featured live music events happening in Thunder Bay that upcoming weekend. After graduation, he moved to Toronto and continued his career as a sales representative for Labatt. He remained at the company for 10 years in different marketing and entertainment roles. In the late 1990s Rapino founded Core Audience Entertainment, a concert promotion company that operated in Canada. Core Audience Entertainment was acquired by SFX Entertainment in 1999, which was in turn acquired by Clear Channel Communications in 2000. Rapino held several roles at Clear Channel Entertainment. He was later named CEO of Live Nation when it was spun off from Clear Channel in 2005.

Live Nation 
As the CEO of Live Nation, Rapino initially focused on expanding the business outside of tour management, including artists’ recording and marketing. Between 2007 and 2010, Rapino announced deals with artists such as Madonna, U2, and Jay-Z. In 2016, Rapino announced a deal between Lady Gaga and Live Nation's management division.

In 2010, Live Nation merged with Ticketmaster, a live entertainment ticket seller. Rapino was named CEO of the new parent company, Live Nation Entertainment. Prior to the merger's approval by the U.S. Justice Department, Rapino and then-Ticketmaster CEO Irving Azoff testified in front of a Senate antitrust panel. They argued that the merger was necessary to reduce inefficiencies and help the music industry, which was struggling financially at the time.

Rapino has led the company in acquiring several festivals and companies, including House of Blues Entertainment in 2006, Bonnaroo Festival in 2015, and Blue Note Entertainment in 2017. Rapino earned $70.6 million in 2017 and was reported to have one of the highest discrepancies in salary between CEO and his employees who earned an average of $24,000. Also in 2017, he extended his contract with Live Nation through 2022. Rapino was appointed to the SiriusXM Radio board of directors in January 2018. Also in 2018, he was listed as #1 on the Billboard Power 100 list of influential people in the music industry.

Rapino began producing films in 2015. In 2018, he served as an executive producer on the HBO documentary “Believer,”  and “A Star is Born”.

Personal life 
Rapino met his wife, American model and actress Jolene Blalock, when he cast her in a commercial he was shooting. Rapino and Blalock married in Negril, Jamaica, on April 22, 2003 and have three sons. Rapino and Blalock founded the Rapino Foundation, an organization that assists populations in the developing world.

Honours
In 2015, Rapino was given an honorary doctorate of commerce from Lakehead University.
He also received the Clara Lionel Foundation Diamond Honors Award for his commitment to philanthropy.

References 

Living people
American business executives
Canadian business executives
Lakehead University alumni
 
Year of birth missing (living people)